Valencia Basket Club S.A.D., commonly known as Valencia Basket, is a professional basketball team based in Valencia, Spain. The team plays in the Liga ACB and the EuroLeague, with home games played at the Fuente de San Luis. The club is sponsored by the Spanish billionaire Juan Roig.

History

1986–1997 
Valencia Basket was founded on 27 September 1986, after Valencia CF decided to fold its basketball section.

On 4 May 1988, while in its second season in the Primera División B, which was the second tier league of Spanish basketball at that time, the team won its first promotion to the Spanish top-tier level ACB, where the team remained until the 1994–95 season. In 1995, Valencia was relegated to the Spanish 2nd-tier level EBA League, after falling in the league's relegation playoff against Somontano Huesca. In the next season, after being the runner-up in Liga EBA, in a non-promoting season, Valencia BC bought Amway Zaragoza's ACB place to join the top league, where it has remained until nowadays.

1998–2014 
On 2 February 1998, Pamesa Valencia won its first Spanish national title, after beating Pinturas Bruguer Badalona, by a score of 89–75, in the final of the 1998 Copa del Rey, which was played in Valladolid. One year later, on 13 April 1999, the club played in the final of the 1998–99 FIBA Saporta Cup, but was defeated by Benetton Treviso, 64–60, in the final played in Zaragoza. Three years later, the club repeated the same success, but Montepaschi Siena won the final of the 2001–02 FIBA Saporta Cup, by a score of 81–71, in Lyon, France.

Continuing on with some of the club's best years, the 2001–02 ACB season was historic for the club, as it reached the Spanish ACB League finals, where they could not win any games in their series against FC Barcelona. Before this first success in reaching the finals of the Spanish league's playoffs, Pamesa Valencia won its first European-wide title, by defeating Krka Novo Mesto in the 2002–03 ULEB Cup, which would then also allow the club to make its debut in the European top-tier level EuroLeague.

In its first EuroLeague participation, Pamesa Valencia qualified for the Top 16, but was eliminated there, after not contesting its game at Nokia Arena against Maccabi Tel Aviv, adducing security issues in Israel.

On 18 April 2010, Power Electronics Valencia won its second European title, by beating Alba Berlin, 67–44, in the 2010 EuroCup Finals, which was played in Vitoria-Gasteiz. This allowed the club to come back to the top level EuroLeague, seven years after its first participation in the tournament. This time, Valencia reached the EuroLeague quarterfinals, where it was eliminated by Real Madrid, who won the playoff series by a 3–2 margin.

The club's third European-wide 2nd-tier level EuroCup title arrived on 7 May 2014, when Valencia beat UNICS Kazan, in the double-legged finals.

2015–present 
On 5 June 2017, Valencia Basket qualified for its second Spanish Liga ACB Finals series, after defeating Baskonia in the semifinals of the 2017 national league playoffs. This time, the club won its first ever Spanish national domestic league championship, on 16 June 2017, by defeating Real Madrid with a 3–1 series score in the ACB league's finals. In the same season, the club also reached the finals of both the Copa del Rey (Spanish Cup), and the EuroCup, but they lost those finals to Real Madrid, and fellow Spanish side, Unicaja, respectively. By winning the Spanish League championship, Valencia also sealed their return to the next season's top-tier level EuroLeague competition, for the 2017–18 season.

The club's fourth European-wide 2nd-tier level EuroCup title arrived on 16 April 2019, when Valencia beat Alba Berlin, in the double-legged finals.

Arena 

Valencia Basket plays its home games at the 8,500 seat Fuente de San Luis arena, however the arena is better known as La Fonteta.

The club is expected to move to a new 15,600 seat arena called Roig Arena (previously proposed as Casal España Arena), with the inauguration scheduled for 2024.

Sponsorship naming 
Valencia Basket has had several sponsorship names over the years:
Valencia-Hoja del Lunes: 1986–1987
Pamesa Valencia: 1987–2009
Power Electronics Valencia: 2009–2011

Logos

Players

Retired numbers

Current roster

Depth chart

FIBA Hall of Famers

Head coaches 

Toni Ferrer: 1986–1987, 1989
Antoni Serra: 1987–1989
José Antonio Figueroa: 1989–1991
Fernando Jiménez: 1991
Manu Moreno: 1992–1995
Herb Brown: 1995
Mihajlo Vuković: 1995–2000
Luis Casimiro: 2000–2002
Paco Olmos: 2002–2004, 2011–2012
Pablo Laso: 2004–2005
Chechu Mulero: 2005, 2006
Ricard Casas: 2005–2006
Fotios Katsikaris: 2006–2008
Neven Spahija: 2008–2010
Manolo Hussein: 2010
Svetislav Pešić: 2010–2011
Velimir Perasović: 2012–2015
Carles Duran: 2015
Pedro Martínez: 2015–2017
Txus Vidorreta: 2017–2018
Jaume Ponsarnau: 2018–2021
Joan Peñarroya: 2021–2022
Álex Mumbrú: 2022–present

Season by season

Honours

Trophies and Awards
Liga ACB: (1)
2017
Runners-up (1): 2003
 Copa del Rey: (1)
1998
Runners-up (4): 2000, 2006, 2013, 2017
 Supercopa: (1)
2017
Saporta Cup:
Runners-up (2): 1999, 2002
 EuroCup Basketball: (4)
2003, 2010, 2014, 2019
Runners-up (2): 2012, 2017

Friendly trophies
 Torneo de Lleida Stagepro: (1)
 2009
 Valencia, Spain Invitational Game: (1)
 2009
 Trofeo Costa de Sol: (1)
 2014
 Trofeo Feria de Albacete: (1)
 2019
 Castello, Spain Invitational Game: (1)
 2019
 Salou, Spain Invitational Game: (1)
 2020

Individual awards 

ACB Most Valuable Player
Justin Doellman – 2014
ACB Finals MVP
Bojan Dubljević – 2017
Spanish Cup MVP
Nacho Rodilla – 1998
Spanish Supercup MVP
Erick Green – 2017
All-ACB First Team
Justin Doellman – 2014
Romain Sato – 2014
Pau Ribas – 2015
Justin Hamilton – 2016
Bojan Dubljević – 2017, 2019
All-ACB Second Team
Bojan Dubljević – 2018
Alberto Abalde – 2020
ACB Slam Dunk Champion
Víctor Claver – 2007

EuroCup Finals MVP
Dejan Tomašević – 2003
Matt Nielsen – 2010
Justin Doellman – 2014
Will Thomas - 2019
EuroCup Rising Star Award
Víctor Claver – 2010
Bojan Dubljević – 2013, 2014
EuroCup Coach of the Year
Pedro Martínez – 2017
All-EuroLeague Second Team
Duško Savanović – 2011
All-EuroCup First Team
Nando De Colo – 2010
Matt Nielsen – 2010
Nik Caner-Medley – 2012
Justin Doellman – 2013, 2014
Bojan Dubljević – 2017, 2019
All-EuroCup Second Team
Matt Nielsen – 2009
Bojan Dubljević – 2014, 2022
Fernando San Emeterio – 2017
Sam Van Rossom – 2019

Notable players 

 Salva Díez
  Johnny Rogers
 Víctor Luengo
 Nacho Rodilla
 Berni Álvarez
 Víctor Claver
 Rafa Martinez
 Pau Ribas
 Guillem Vives
 Fernando San Emeterio
 Alberto Abalde
 Alejandro Montecchia
 Federico Kammerichs
 Fabricio Oberto
 Matt Nielsen
 Tiago Splitter
 Vítor Faverani
 Antoine Rigaudeau
 Florent Piétrus
 Nando de Colo
 Mickaël Gelabale
  Justin Doellman
 Robertas Javtokas
 Mindaugas Timinskas
 Dejan Tomašević
 Igor Rakočević
 Kosta Perović
 Duško Savanović
 Nikola Kalinić
 Tornike Shengelia
  Shammond Williams
 Dimos Dikoudis
 Serhiy Lishchuk
 Brad Branson
 Erick Green
 Bernard Hopkins
 Tanoka Beard
 Brian Cardinal
 Derrick Williams

Women's team

The women's team of Valencia Basket was created in 2014 and promoted to Liga Femenina in 2018, winning the final game against Real Club Celta de Vigo in Valencia. This access to the first division and the relegation of Club Baloncesto Estudiantes (femenino) made Valencia Basket the only club with masculine and feminine representation in the first division in the 2018-2019 season. 

In the first season competing on the first division, Valencia Basket achieved a ticket to their first Copa de la Reina de baloncesto, celebrated in Vitoria between the 28th of February and the 3 of June. Also, they achieve a spot to participate in the playoffs, losing against Perfumerías Avenida on the semifinals, but achieving the opportunity to play his first European tournament the next season.

References

External links 
 Official website
 Valencia Basket at ACB.com 
 Valencia Basket at the EuroLeague

 
Basketball teams in the Valencian Community
Basketball teams established in 1986
Liga ACB teams
Sport in Valencia